Sir Robert Gore-Booth, 4th Baronet (25 August 1805 – 21 December 1876) was an Anglo-Irish politician and landowner, who built Lissadell House, located in County Sligo.

Background and education
Born at Bath, Somerset, he was the son of Sir Robert Gore-Booth, 3rd Baronet and his wife Hannah, the daughter of Henry Irwin. In 1814, aged only nine, he succeeded his father as baronet. He was educated at Westminster School and went then to Queens' College, Cambridge, graduating with a Master of Arts in 1826.

Career
During the period of the Great Famine, Sir Robert was accused of arbitrarily evicting starving tenant farmers from his land and packing them into leaky, overcrowded emigrant ships headed for Canada and America. However, other accounts insist that he mortgaged the estate to help feed his tenants and refused to accept any rents for the duration. Which version of events is closer to the truth is still a matter of controversy.

He was appointed High Sheriff of Sligo for 1830. In 1850 he was elected MP for Sligo County in the British House of Commons, representing the constituency for twenty-six years until his death. Having been a Deputy Lieutenant from 1841, he was appointed Lord Lieutenant of Sligo in 1868.

Family

In 1827, Gore-Booth married firstly Caroline, the second daughter of Robert King, 1st Viscount Lorton. She died a year later, and after another two years as a widower, he remarried Caroline Susan, second daughter of Thomas Goold, Serjeant-at-law (Ireland) and Elizabeth Nixon. His second wife died in 1855 and Gore-Booth survived her until his death in 1876 aged 71. He was succeeded in the baronetcy by his second son, Henry.

References

Bibliography

External links

1805 births
1876 deaths
People educated at Westminster School, London
Alumni of Queens' College, Cambridge
Baronets in the Baronetage of Ireland
Robert
Lord-Lieutenants of Sligo
Members of the Parliament of the United Kingdom for County Sligo constituencies (1801–1922)
High Sheriffs of County Sligo
Politicians from County Sligo
UK MPs 1847–1852
UK MPs 1852–1857
UK MPs 1857–1859
UK MPs 1859–1865
UK MPs 1865–1868
UK MPs 1868–1874
UK MPs 1874–1880